The Second Annual Report is the debut album by English industrial music group Throbbing Gristle, released in November 1977 through Industrial Records. It is a combination of live and studio recordings made from October 1976 to September 1977. The Second Annual Report is considered to be influential within electronic music, being one of the first industrial music albums.

Background 

The original vinyl edition went through several pressings. Industrial Records' original pressing totalled 785 copies, while Fetish Records pressed 2,000 copies followed by additional runs. Fetish would press the album twice more after the original Industrial Records master plates were destroyed. The third edition was included in the five-album Throbbing Gristle box set; the album was recut to play backwards and included a chamber orchestra on the track "After Cease to Exist". The Fetish plates were reused to cut pressings made by Mute Records and Celluloid Records, the latter of which was supposedly released without the band's permission. (At the very least, the Celluloid issue is known to have poor sound quality.) Towards the very end of track 8, "Recorded at Brighton" (incorrectly listed on many re-releases as "Maggot Death - Brighton"), "Down on the Street" by The Stooges can be heard during the fade-out.

The original side 1 of the album features mostly highlight 'documentations' of four of Throbbing Gristle's circa-one-hour live recordings to date - skilfully edited down to track-sized passages by group-members Chris Carter and Peter Christopherson - augmented by only two studio recordings, "Industrial Introduction" and "Maggot Death". Side 2 consists entirely of a film soundtrack, one which (anecdotally) was conceived before the film that accompanied it. The soundtrack presented here is also significantly longer than the visual content of the film.

Interestingly, despite the original release of the album by Industrial Records (unsurprisingly) listing each of those live excerpts correctly as "Recorded at...", many of the Fetish Records re-released copies and subsequent other re-releases have listed the live passages with the title of the preceding named track in the track-list. Both live tracks between "Slug Bait" and "Maggot Death" in the running order are incorrectly also listed as "Slug Bait", with all three following "Maggot Death" incorrectly listed also as "Maggot Death". The Fetish re-releases being international releases, similar misreporting of track titles has pervaded subsequent releases of the album: even track 8, "Recorded at Brighton", which features merely a near-1-minute edit of the Brighton Polytechnic DJ berating the unappreciative audience (and the start of the Stooges record played after the performance), is mis-titled as "Maggot Death - Brighton", despite having no similarity to the actual "Maggot Death" track or song ("Maggot Death" being the fairly up-tempo studio track earlier on side 1) or direct involvement of Throbbing Gristle. Thus, tracks listed on most re-releases of the album as additional interpretations of both "Slug Bait" and "Maggot Death", were actually live-performance highlights, at the time unrelated to the tracks of those names.

Full audio footage of each of Throbbing Gristle's live performances was released in 1979 (individually or as a '24-hour' encased set) on audio cassette (only) by Industrial Records, with the performances represented by the Second Annual Report album released as catalogue numbers IRC2 (ICA), IRC5 (Brighton Poly), IRC6 (Nuffield, Southampton) and IRC7 (Rat Club, London). Helpfully, the cassette inlay cards listed all titled pieces in the order performed. Neither "Slug Bait" nor "Maggot Death" are listed on IRC5, IRC6 or IRC7, nor any others in the period concerned except IRC4 (High Wycombe) and, of course, IRC2 (ICA) that each list "Slug Bait", with both including a recognisable version of the 'song'.

That this went largely-uncorrected for decades, may reflect an interpretation of misinformation as a result of zeal for classification and 'cataloguing' that would have surely amused the members of Throbbing Gristle, although the long-standing and repeated misnomer problem was corrected in the Remastered Edition released 28 October 2011 - possibly due to the personal involvement of group-members Chris Carter and Cosey Fanni Tutti in its creation and design. Despite the correction, those incorrect title references continued to pervade the Internet a decade later.

Original LP release track details 

Despite carrying the catalogue number, "IR0002", the 12" vinyl Second Annual Report album was the first official release from Industrial Records. There was no IR0001. There was also no first annual report, although Throbbing Gristle's earlier, unofficial cassette-only 'release', "Best Of... Volume II", subsequently became nicknamed "(The) First Annual Report" by fans. Later released on cassette only (Industrial Records catalogue number IRC1), it was released many years later on other formats in the name, "The First Annual Report".

Critical reception 

Michael Bonner of Uncut described the music as "a dystopian churn of smoke and asbestos dust" and "queerly hypnotic". The Vinyl Factory's Anton Spice acknowledged the role of the album with its provocative subject matter in establishing Throbbing Gristle's reputation as a transgressive figure in underground electronic music.

Thirty-Second Annual Report 

In 2008, a limited-edition album titled Thirty-Second Annual Report, or The Thirty-Second Annual Report of Throbbing Gristle, was released in commemoration of the thirtieth anniversary of The Second Annual Report, as well as to mark the official re-activation of the Industrial Records label. The 12" 180gm vinyl LP comprises a recording of Throbbing Gristle's live performance at La Villette in Paris on 6 June 2008, which was a reinterpretation of their original album, and is limited to 777 copies. This album is pre-framed in bespoke, high-quality white gloss acrylic with an easy access clear window for removal of the record/sleeve so that the buyer can play the album and then reseal it in the frame. Accompanying the packaged vinyl is a special "black" extended CD version, which includes extra tracks that would not fit on the LP format. There is a version of the recording available for download, but the track lengths are different from the vinyl edition.

Track listing 

Note
The positions of Maggot Death and live, Rat Club are swapped on the 2011 remastered edition's first disc.

Personnel 

According to AllMusic:

 Genesis P-Orridge – bass, clarinet, guitar, liner notes, violin, vocals
 Chris Carter – synthesizers, programming, mixing, photography
 Cosey Fanni Tutti – guitar, liner notes, photography, vocals
 Peter Christopherson – processing, tape, trumpet, unknown contributor role

References

External links 

 

Throbbing Gristle albums
1977 debut albums